Pachyosteus is an extinct monospecific genus of medium-sized selenosteid arthrodire placoderm known from the Upper Frasnian Kellwasserkalk facies of Late Devonian Bad Wildungen, Germany and from the Famennian portions of the Holy Cross Mountains of Poland.

Phylogeny
Pachyosteus is a member of the family Selenosteidae of the clade Aspinothoracidi, which belongs to the clade Pachyosteomorphi, one of the two major clades within Eubrachythoraci. The cladogram below shows the phylogeny of Pachyosteus:

In his cladogram, Rücklin (2011) regards Pachyosteus bulla as a basal selenosteid, being the sister taxon of the American genera, and the Kellwasserkalk genera of Germany and Morocco.

References

Selenosteidae
Placoderms of Europe
Fossil taxa described in 1903